= Sharp angle =

Sharp angle may refer to:

- Acute angle
- Sharp's angle of the hip
